LeJuandro 'Kai' Zeiglar (born January 15, 1981) is a professional Arena Football League (American football) offensive and defensive linemen who played college football at Middle Tennessee State.

High school
Kai attended Copperas Cove High School where he played under Head Coach Jack Welsh.

College
Before attending Middle Tennessee State, Zeigler went to Kilgore Junior College. He was also recruited by Memphis, Iowa State, LSU and New Mexico.

Pro career
In 2008, Zeiglar was a member of the CenTex Barracudas. On April 16, 2009, he was signed by the Austin Turfcats In 2011, Zeigler was a member of the Tulsa Talons of the Arena Football League.

References

Middle Tennessee Blue Raiders football players
Tulsa Talons players
CenTex Barracudas players
Austin Turfcats players
Central Valley Coyotes players
Living people
1981 births